Amit Lodha (Hindi: अमित लोढ़ा) (born 22 February 1974) is a 1998 batch Indian Police Service (IPS) officer of Bihar Cadre , currently serving as Inspector General.He has received several awards for his work. He is known for his book Bihar Diaries: The True Story of How Bihar's Most Dangerous Criminal Was Caught. The web-series Khakee: The Bihar Chapter on Netflix is based on that book.

Early life and career 
Lodha is an 1995 alumnus of IIT Delhi. He joined the IPS in 1998. Lodha was posted in the newly created, Sheikhpura District of Bihar in 2005. As of December 2022, Lodha is an Inspector General rank officer in Bihar Police.

Controversies 
In December 2022 Lodha was booked under several sections of Indian Penal Code and Prevention of Corruption Act for entering a commercial deal with Netflix as a government servant and writing the book Bihar Diaries without taking prior permission or approval from the government. Lodha has mentioned that he has done nothing wrong.
Controversy has also been created by the media that he was suspended but he has never been suspended, the government has also not released any statement regarding suspension.He is still in service serving as Inspector General (SCRB) in Patna , Bihar .

See also
Ashok Mahto gang

References 

1974 births
People from Jaipur
IIT Delhi alumni
Indian police officers
Living people
Penguin Books people